Dimitri Van den Bergh (born 8 July 1994) is a Belgian professional darts player who currently competes in Professional Darts Corporation (PDC) events. He is a two-time World Youth Champion and the 2020 World Matchplay champion, after beating Gary Anderson 18–10 in the final, in his first time competing in the Matchplay.

Career

BDO
In 2013, Van den Bergh won the British Teenage Open by beating Billy Longshaw 3–0 in the final. Two months later he claimed the 16th PDC Challenge Tour event of the year by whitewashing Reece Robinson 4–0.

PDC

2014 
In 2014, he entered Q School in an attempt to earn a PDC tour card, but he couldn't advance beyond the last 64 in any of the four days. However, he was granted PDPA Associate Member status for participating which gave him entry into UK Open and European tour qualifiers. Van den Bergh qualified for the first European Tour event, the German Darts Championship and lost 6–2 in the first round against Ronnie Baxter despite averaging 102.94. Van den Bergh won three youth tour titles during the year and also reached the last 16 of the Under-21 World Championship, where he lost 6–3 to Robinson. He finished top of the Youth Tour Order of Merit which earned him a two-year card for the main PDC tour.

2015 
Van den Bergh claimed two Development Tour titles in 2015. He reached the last 16 of a PDC event for the first time at the third Players Championship event, but lost 6–5 to Mensur Suljović. Van den Bergh was also knocked out in the second round of three European Tour events. He qualified for the inaugural World Series of Darts Finals but was beaten 6–3 by Max Hopp in the first round in what was Van den Bergh's televised debut.

2016 
He qualified for the 2016 World Championship through the European Pro Tour Order of Merit and danced on to the stage before his first round encounter with Ian White. Van den Bergh missed four darts for the first set, but went on to win 3–1 taking out four ton-plus finishes during the match. He lost 4–2 to Benito van de Pas in the following round. Van den Bergh won the 14th Development Tour event by overcoming Steve Lennon 4–2. At the 15th Players Championship tournament Van den Bergh reached the semi-finals of a main tour event for the first time with wins over Devon Petersen, Jan Dekker, Ronny Huybrechts, Chris Dobey and Cristo Reyes, but he lost 6–2 to Michael van Gerwen. In the semi-finals of the World Youth Championship, Van den Bergh was beaten 6–3 by Corey Cadby. He won a place at the Grand Slam by coming through the qualifying event and edged his first group match 5–4 over Gerwyn Price. Van den Bergh was then beaten 5–4 by Robert Thornton, but after defeating Scott Waites 5–4 in the final group game it meant he was tied with Thornton on points and leg difference. This meant a nine-dart shoot-out was required to decide who would advance to the knock-out stage and Thornton won by 345 points to 340.

2017 
Van den Bergh's first round match at the 2017 World Championship went to a deciding set and was on throw, but he missed two darts at double eight to send it to a tie-break, allowing Cristo Reyes to step in and win 3–2. At the end of the year, Van den Bergh became World Youth Champion by defeating Josh Payne 6–3 in the final. He would defend his title the following year by defeating Germany's Martin Schindler in the final.

2018 
At the 2018 PDC World Darts Championship, Van den Bergh reached the quarter-finals for the first time, where he lost 5–4 to eventual champion Rob Cross in a tight match.
Van den Bergh's debut in the World Series of Darts came with a stellar performance in the 2018 German Darts Masters where he lost in the final to Mensur Suljović 2–8 after defeating Michael van Gerwen 8–3 in the quarter-final and Gary Anderson 8–7 in the semi-final.

2019 
At the 2019 PDC World Darts Championship, Van den Bergh lost 4–1 to Luke Humphries in the third round.
Following Gary Anderson's withdrawal from the 2019 Premier League, Van den Bergh was selected as one of nine 'contenders' to replace him. He would play a one-off match against James Wade on night eight in Rotterdam, recording a 6–6 draw. Van den Bergh reached two Players Championship finals, but lost in both to Glen Durrant and Krzysztof Ratajski respectively. Later in the year, he would qualify for the World Grand Prix for the first time, but he let a 1–0 lead slip and eventually lost 2–1 to Mervyn King. In the 2020 PDC World Darts Championship, Van den Bergh scored high averages in defeating Josh Payne, Luke Woodhouse and Adrian Lewis, before losing to Nathan Aspinall in the quarter-finals.

2020 
At the 2020 PDC World Darts Championship, Van den Bergh reached the quarter-finals for the second time, there he lost to Nathan Aspinall 5–3.
In March he reached the quarter-finals of the UK Open before succumbing to Gerwyn Price. Then, after spending the whole first COVID-19 pandemic lockdown in the UK, staying at Peter Wright's house, Van den Bergh pulled off the biggest achievement of his career by winning the 2020 World Matchplay on his debut, after defeating Nathan Aspinall, Joe Cullen, Adrian Lewis, Glen Durrant and Gary Anderson to win the £115,000 top prize, and move him into the Top 10 in the world for the first time.

2021 
At the 2021 PDC World Darts Championship, Van den Bergh lost 4–2 in the fourth round to Dave Chisnall.
In defence of his World Matchplay title, he reached the final, before losing 18–9 to Peter Wright

Van den Bergh qualified for the 2021 Nordic Darts Masters where he defeated Sweden's Johan Engström 6-4 in the first round, and defeated Gary Anderson 10-8 in the Quarter finals before he lost to Fallon Sherrock 11-10 in the semi finals.

2022 
At the 2022 PDC World Darts Championship, Van den Bergh suffered a shock second round defeat to Florian Hempel. At the Masters he reached the second round, defeating Ian White 6-1 in round 1 with a 105.31 average, but then losing 10-9 to Jonny Clayton in round 2.  In June 2022, Van den Bergh won the 2022 Nordic Darts Masters, defeating Benjamin Drue Reus, Gerwyn Price and Michael Smith en route to a final against Gary Anderson which the Belgian won 11–4.

2023
At the 2023 PDC World Championship, Van den Bergh reached the quarterfinals for the third time and was finally able to progress further, seeing off Jonny Clayton 5-3, and as a result became the first Belgian player to reach the semi-finals of a PDC World Championship. before succumbing to a 6–0 defeat to Michael van Gerwen.

World Championship performances

PDC
 2016: Second round (lost to Benito van de Pas 2–4)
 2017: First round (lost to Cristo Reyes 2–3)
 2018: Quarter-finals (lost to Rob Cross 4–5)
 2019: Third round (lost to Luke Humphries 1–4)
 2020: Quarter-finals (lost to Nathan Aspinall 3–5)
 2021: Fourth round (lost to Dave Chisnall 2–4)
 2022: Second round (lost to Florian Hempel 1–3)
 2023: Semi-finals (lost to Michael van Gerwen 0–6)

Career finals

PDC major finals: 3 (1 title, 2 runner-up)

PDC world series finals: 3 (2 titles, 1 runner-up)

Performance timeline

PDC European Tour

Nine-dart finishes

Notes

References

External links

Living people
Professional Darts Corporation current tour card holders
Belgian darts players
1994 births
Sportspeople from Antwerp
World Matchplay (darts) champions
PDC world youth champions
World Series of Darts winners
Darts players who have thrown televised nine-dart games
PDC World Cup of Darts Belgian team